The name Wutip has been used to name four tropical cyclones in the Western Pacific Ocean. The name was submitted by Macau and means butterfly.

 Typhoon Wutip (2001) (T0112, 16W) – a Category 4 super typhoon that remained in the open ocean.
 Tropical Storm Wutip (2007) (T0707, 08W, Dodong) – affected the Philippines and Taiwan.
 Typhoon Wutip (2013) (T1321, 20W, Paolo) – a Category 3 typhoon that made landfall in Vietnam.
 Typhoon Wutip (2019) (T1902, 02W, Betty) – a Category 5 super typhoon that affected Guam, Federated States of Micronesia, Northern Mariana Islands.

Pacific typhoon set index articles